Pierre Jonquères d'Oriola (1 February 1920 – 19 July 2011) was a French equestrian who competed in show jumping. He is the only person to win two individual Olympic gold medals in this discipline.

Biography
D'Oriola's first gold medal was won at the 1952 Olympic Games in  Helsinki, on the French gelding Ali Baba, and his second gold at the 1964 Olympic Games in Tokyo, riding the French gelding Lutteur B.  Also in Tokyo, with Janous Lefevre and  Guy Lefrant, again riding Lutteur B, he earned a team silver medal in jumping.  In Mexico City, 1968, on Nagir, with teammates Lefevre and Jean Marcel Rozier, he acquired another silver in team jumping.

At the 1953 Show Jumping World Championships, in Paris, d'Oriola (on Ali Baba) took a bronze medal in the individual competition.  In 1954, at Madrid, on Arlequin, he gained a silver in the individual competition.  D'Oriola, riding Pomone B, was the gold medal World Champion in show jumping at Buenos Aires in 1966. He was also fourth at the 1953 and 1955 World Championships.

D'Oriola, with horse Virtuoso, was silver medalist at the European Show Jumping Championships in Paris, 1959.

D'Oriola's cousin, Christian, was also both an Olympic and world champion, but in fencing.

References

External links

Olympic medals

1920 births
2011 deaths
Sportspeople from Pyrénées-Orientales
French male equestrians
French show jumping riders
Olympic equestrians of France
Equestrians at the 1952 Summer Olympics
Equestrians at the 1956 Summer Olympics
Equestrians at the 1960 Summer Olympics
Equestrians at the 1964 Summer Olympics
Equestrians at the 1968 Summer Olympics
Olympic gold medalists for France
Olympic silver medalists for France
Olympic medalists in equestrian
Medalists at the 1968 Summer Olympics
Medalists at the 1964 Summer Olympics
Medalists at the 1952 Summer Olympics
20th-century French people